The 2023 Alberta general election is scheduled by law to be held on May 29, 2023, to elect the members of the Legislative Assembly of Alberta.  Election dates are fixed under Alberta's Election Act, but that does not affect the powers of the lieutenant governor of Alberta to specify a different day in accordance with provisions in the aforementioned act, the Constitution of Canada and the usual conventions of the Westminster parliamentary system.

Background
In the 2019 general election, the United Conservative Party (UCP) under the leadership of Jason Kenney defeated incumbent Premier Rachel Notley and her New Democratic Party (NDP). During the ensuing 30th Alberta Legislature the UCP formed a majority government with Kenney as premier. Notley and the NDP formed the Official Opposition. No other party won a seat, even though the Alberta Party had received 9% of the vote. In preparation for the next general election, the government adopted the Election Statutes Amendment Act, 2021 (No. 2) (Bill 81 of the second session). The amendments altered the fixed election date to be the last Monday in May unless the lieutenant governor dissolves the Legislature sooner; raised election spending limits for political parties and for nomination contestants; and prohibited third-party advertisers who have a certain type of affiliation to a political party.

Timeline

2019
April 16: The United Conservative Party (UCP) wins a majority government in the 30th Alberta General Election, defeating the previous Alberta New Democratic Party (NDP) government which had governed since 2015. No other parties won seats in the election.
April 30: Jason Kenney is sworn in as the 18th premier of Alberta. The first UCP cabinet is likewise sworn in. Derek Fildebrandt resigns as leader of the Freedom Conservative Party of Alberta.
May 21: Olds-Didsbury-Three Hills MLA Nathan Cooper is elected Speaker of the Legislative Assembly.
June 30: Stephen Mandel resigns as leader of the Alberta Party.
September 4: Cheryle Chagnon-Greyeyes resigns as leader of the Green Party of Alberta. Will Carnegie is appointed interim leader.

2020
February 10: Former PC MLA Jacquie Fenske is announced as acting leader of the Alberta Party.
March 28: Jordan Wilkie is elected leader of the Green Party of Alberta.
June 29: Members of Wexit Alberta and the Freedom Conservative Party of Alberta voted to approve a merger into the Wildrose Independence Party of Alberta (WIP).
July 17: The WIP announced that Paul Hinman would serve as interim leader until the party's founding convention and leadership contest.
November 22: Alberta Liberal Party Leader David Khan resigns.

2021
January 4: Six UCP MLAs are demoted by Jason Kenney for travelling internationally during the COVID-19 pandemic in Alberta.
January 14: Pat Rehn is removed from the UCP caucus to sit as an independent. Jason Kenney cited a lack of constituency work as the reason for the removal.
March 6: John Roggeveen is appointed interim leader of the Alberta Liberal Party.
April 7: 17 UCP MLAs sign an open letter criticizing the Alberta government for reimposing more stringent public health restrictions aimed at combatting COVID-19.
May 13: UCP MLA Todd Loewen resigns as UCP Caucus Chair and releases a letter calling on Jason Kenney to resign. Loewen and Drew Barnes are expelled from the UCP caucus through a caucus-wide vote. Both MLAs had criticized the UCP government's response to COVID-19. Both will sit as independents.
July 13: Paul Hinman is elected leader of the WIP.
July 14: Pat Rehn, Independent MLA for Lesser Slave Lake rejoins the UCP Caucus.
August 15: Laila Goodridge resigns as the UCP MLA for Fort McMurray-Lac La Biche to run in the 2021 Canadian federal election.
August 31: Barry Morishita is acclaimed as leader of the Alberta Party.
November 15: 22 UCP constituency associations announce they have passed special motions calling for a review of Jason Kenney's leadership by March 1, 2022.
December 21: NDP MLA Thomas Dang resigns from the NDP caucus after the RCMP search his home.

2022
March 15: Brian Jean, a former leader of the Wildrose Party, won the Fort McMurray-Lac La Biche by-election for the UCP.
March 24: UCP MLAs Jason Stephan and Peter Guthrie call on Jason Kenney to resign.
May 18: Jason Kenney won 51.4% of votes in favour of him staying as leader in a UCP leadership review vote. However, he announced he would resign shortly after the result was revealed.
May 19: The UCP caucus meets and decides to keep Jason Kenney as party leader and premier until a successor is chosen.
August 31: Doug Schweitzer resigns as the UCP MLA for Calgary-Elbow, roughly three weeks after resigning from cabinet.
October 6: The results of the UCP leadership election were announced, with former Wildrose Party leader Danielle Smith elected leader and therefore the next premier. In her victory speech, she invited former UCP MLA and fellow leadership candidate Todd Loewen back into caucus.
October 7: Michaela Frey, UCP MLA for Brooks-Medicine Hat resigns her seat and urges premier-designate Smith to run in a by-election there. Todd Loewen rejoins the UCP caucus.
October 11: Danielle Smith is sworn in as the 19th premier of Alberta.
October 21: Wildrose Independence Party leader Paul Hinman is removed as leader by a court decision. Jeevan Mangat is named interim party leader. Hinman is appealing the decision.
November 8: Danielle Smith wins by-election in Brooks-Medicine Hat.
November 30: Calgary-Lougheed MLA and former Premier Jason Kenney resigned from the Alberta Legislature.
December 8: John Roggeveen is appointed permanent leader of the Alberta Liberal Party.

Incumbent MLAs not seeking re-election
The following MLAs have announced that they would not run in the 2023 provincial election:
{| class="wikitable"
!colspan="3"|Retiring incumbent
!Electoral district
!colspan=2|Subsequent party nominee
!colspan=2|Elected MLA
|-

|Thomas Dang 
|Independent
|Edmonton-South 
||
|Rhiannon Hoyle
|- 

|Deron Bilous 
|New Democratic
|Edmonton-Beverly-Clareview
||
|Peggy Wright
|- 

|Jon Carson 
|New Democratic
|Edmonton-West Henday
||
|Brooks Arcand-Paul
|- 

|Richard Feehan 
|New Democratic
|Edmonton-Rutherford
||
|Jodi Calahoo Stonehouse
|- 

|Leela Aheer 
|United Conservative
|Chestermere-Strathmore 
||
|Chantelle de Jonge
|- 

|Richard Gotfried 
|United Conservative
|Calgary-Fish Creek 
||
|Myles McDougall

|Ron Orr 
|United Conservative
|Lacombe-Ponoka 
||
|Jennifer Johnson

|Pat Rehn
|United Conservative
|Lesser Slave Lake 
||
|Scott Sinclair

|Roger Reid 
|United Conservative
|Livingstone-Macleod 
||
|

|Brad Rutherford 
|United Conservative
|Leduc-Beaumont 
||
|
|-

|Mark Smith
|United Conservative
|Drayton Valley-Devon
||
|Andrew Boitchenko

|Rajan Sawhney 
|United Conservative
|Calgary-North East 
||
|
|-

Opinion polling

Voting intentions in Alberta since the 2019 election

The following is a list of published opinion polls of voter intentions.

Opinion poll sources

References

Footnotes

External links
Government of Alberta
Elections Alberta

Elections in Alberta
Alberta
2023 in Alberta
Alberta general election